The 2012 Bangladesh Federation Cup was the 25th edition of the association football competition. It was won by Sheikh Russel KC for their first title, defeating Sheikh Jamal Dhanmondi Club 2-1 in extra time.

The competition started on 5 October and finished with the final at the Bangabandhu National Stadium on 22 October.

15 teams took part with the first round being played as a Group Stage, three groups contained four teams with one group of three teams. The top two teams from each group qualified for the Quarter Final Stage.

Group stage

Group A

Group B

Group C

Group D

Quarter finals

Semi finals

Final

2011
2012 in Bangladeshi football